The 2017 Renault UK Clio Cup is a multi-event, one make motor racing championship held across England. The championship features a mix of professional motor racing teams and privately funded drivers competing in the Clio Renaultsport 200 Turbo EDC that conform to the technical regulations for the championship. Organised by the British Automobile Racing Club, it forms part of the extensive program of support categories built up around the British Touring Car Championship. It will be the 22nd Renault Clio Cup United Kingdom season and the 42nd of UK motorsport undertaken by Renault and Renault Sport. The first race takes place on 2 April at Brands Hatch on the circuit's Indy configuration and concluded on 1 October at the same venue, utilising the Grand Prix circuit, after eighteen races held at nine meetings.

Teams and drivers

The following teams and drivers are currently signed to run the 2017 season.

Race calendar and results
The provisional calendar was announced by the championship organisers on 25 August 2016, with no major changes from the previous season.

Championship standings

Drivers' championship

References

External links

 

Renault Clio Cup UK seasons
Renault UK Clio Cup